The 1940 Bucknell Bison football team was an American football team that represented Bucknell University as an independent during the 1940 college football season. In their fourth season under head coach Al Humphreys, the Bison compiled a 4–2–2 record and outscored opponents by a total of 73 to 33.

The team played its home games at Memorial Stadium in Lewisburg, Pennsylvania.

Schedule

References

Bucknell
Bucknell Bison football seasons
Bucknell Bison football